A roundel is a circular charge in heraldry. Roundels are among the oldest charges used in coats of arms, dating from the start of the age of heraldry in Europe, circa 1200–1215. Roundels are typically a solid colour but may be charged with an item or be any of the furs used in heraldry. Roundels are similar to the annulet, which some heralds would refer to as a false roundel.

Terms for roundels 
In some languages, the heraldic roundel has a unique name specific to its tincture, based on the Old French tradition. This is still observed in English-language heraldry, which adopted terms from Old French for specific round items. Thus, while a gold roundel may be blazoned by its tincture, e.g., a roundel or, it is more often described as a bezant, from the Old French term besant for a gold coin, which itself is named for the Byzantine Empire.

The terms and their origin can be seen in the following table:

A roundel vert ("green roundel") is known as a pomme, the French word for apple. It was frequently pluralised as pomeis – as in the Heathcote arms: Ermine, three pomeis, each charged with a cross or – but pommes is now more common. The term for a red roundel, torteau, is typically pluralised in the French manner as  rather than torteaus, although torteaus is occasionally seen. A pellet may also be called an ogress.

In modern French-language blazonry, a roundel of any metal (Or or Argent) is a besant (being specified as a "besant d'or" or a "besant d'argent"), and a roundel of any colour is a torteau (for instance, a blue roundel is a "torteau d'azur"). However, an alternate naming system is occasionally, with similar terms as English heraldry (plate for argent, heurte for azure (fr:azur), ogress for sable, pomme for vert (fr:sinople), guse for sanguine, and gulpe for purpure (fr:pourpre)). Archaic names for roundels based on the French tradition are sometimes found in other languages, such as Spanish (see ) and Portuguese (see )

Special roundels

Fountain
One special example of a named roundel is the fountain, depicted as a roundel barry wavy argent and azure, that is, containing alternating horizontal wavy bands of blue and silver (or white). Because the fountain consists equally of parts in a light and a dark tincture, its use is not limited by the rule of tincture as are the other roundels.  The traditional fountain in heraldry was a barry wavy of six, that is, with six alternating wavy rows of white and blue.

Another name for the fountain is the syke (Northern English for "well"). One of the most well-known and ancient uses of the fountain is in the arms of the Stourton family. Three fountains appear on the arms of County Leitrim, Ireland.

Semy 
In their earliest uses, roundels were often strewn or sown as seeds (Latin: semen, -inis, a seed) upon the field of a coat of arms, blazoned as semée/semy, an arrangement with numerous varieties. For example, a field semy of plates (i.e. roundels argent) could be blazoned  platy; a field semy of pellets (i.e. roundels sable) could be blazoned pellety. The precise number and placement of the roundels in such cases were usually left to the discretion of the artist.

See also 
 Annulet (heraldry)

References 

Heraldic charges